Almeyda, Queen of Granada is a 1796 tragedy play by the British writer Sophia Lee.

The original Drury Lane cast included John Palmer as Abdallah, James Aickin as Ramirez, Richard Wroughton as Orasmyn, John Philip Kemble as Alonzo, Thomas Caulfield as Nourassin, Charles Kemble as Hamet, Sarah Siddons as Almeyda and Jane Powell as Victoria.

References

Bibliography
 Nicoll, Allardyce. A History of English Drama 1660-1900: Volume III. Cambridge University Press, 2009.
 Hogan, C.B (ed.) The London Stage, 1660-1800: Volume V''. Southern Illinois University Press, 1968.

1796 plays
British plays
Tragedy plays
West End plays